KQAY-FM (92.7 FM) is a radio station licensed to Tucumcari, New Mexico, United States.  The station is currently owned by Ingalls Holdings, LLC.

References

External links

QAY-FM